WKTK (98.5 FM) is a commercial radio station licensed to Crystal River, Florida, and serving the Gainesville–Ocala radio market. It is owned by Audacy, Inc., and carries an adult contemporary radio format, switching to Christmas music for much of November and December.  

WKTK has an effective radiated power (ERP) of 100,000 watts, currently the maximum for FM stations in Florida.  Its strong signal can be picked up in portions of Orlando, Jacksonville, and the Tampa Bay Area.

History
On , the station signed on the air.  Its call sign was originally WRYO.  The station was owned by the Cape Christian Broadcasters of Florida, and it had a Christian radio format. It used United Press International for its news service.

The call letters WKTK ("Koast-to-Koast", referring to the station's large coverage area stretching from the Atlantic Ocean to the Gulf of Mexico) were adopted in 1986.  WKTK has been through various forms of the adult contemporary and hot AC formats since before finally settling into the mainstream AC sound it now uses.

On May 19, 2008, utilizing iBiquity's in-band on-channel (IBOC) digital radio technology, WKTK-FM began broadcasting its signal in both digital (HD-1) and analog (FM) formats.  In addition to the digital launch, WKTK-HD2 began broadcasting the area's only all digital, all blues music format, branded as The Swamp WKTK-HD2 (98.5-2). The station was granted special permission to use "The Swamp" from The University of Florida in homage of the school's football stadium which is commonly referred to as The Swamp, Ben Hill Griffin Stadium at Florida Field.

WKTK is Gainesville-Ocala's home of the syndicated Delilah show airing nightly except for Saturdays, when the station airs Throwback Nation Radio. As part of an annual tradition, WKTK switches to all Christmas music from mid-November until Christmas Day.

WKTK-HD2
On September 14, 2022 WKTK-HD2 launched an urban contemporary format, branded as "Power 92.1", fed on translator W221DX 92.1 FM Gainesville.

References

External links

KTK
Mainstream adult contemporary radio stations in the United States
Radio stations established in 1976
1976 establishments in Florida
Audacy, Inc. radio stations